The Ruen Icefall on Rozhen Peninsula in eastern Livingston Island, South Shetland Islands in Antarctica is situated south of Huntress Glacier, northwest of Prespa Glacier and northeast of Peshtera and Charity Glaciers.  It descends towards False Bay from the circus overlooked by Simeon Peak, St. Cyril Peak and St. Methodius Peak in Friesland Ridge, Tangra Mountains.

Ruen is the summit of Osogovo Mountain in south-western Bulgaria.

Location

Maps
 L.L. Ivanov et al. Antarctica: Livingston Island and Greenwich Island, South Shetland Islands. Scale 1:100000 topographic map. Sofia: Antarctic Place-names Commission of Bulgaria, 2005.
 L.L. Ivanov. Antarctica: Livingston Island and Greenwich, Robert, Snow and Smith Islands. Scale 1:120000 topographic map.  Troyan: Manfred Wörner Foundation, 2009.

References
 Ruen Icefall. SCAR Composite Antarctic Gazetteer
 Bulgarian Antarctic Gazetteer. Antarctic Place-names Commission. (details in Bulgarian, basic data in English)

External links
 Ruen Icefall. Copernix satellite image

Tangra Mountains